Venegono Superiore is a comune (municipality) in the Province of Varese in the Italian region Lombardy, located about  northwest of Milan and about  southeast of Varese.

Venegono Superiore borders the following municipalities: Binago, Castiglione Olona, Vedano Olona, Venegono Inferiore.

Alenia Aeronautica has its head office in Venegono Superiore.

References

External links

 Official website 
 Coat of arms
 Missionari Comboniani
 Enzo Lunari's comic about Venegono

Cities and towns in Lombardy